Thomas Bruce may refer to:

Thomas Bruce, 7th Earl of Elgin (1766–1841), British nobleman and diplomat
Thomas Bruce, 2nd Earl of Ailesbury (1656–1741), 3rd Earl of Elgin, British peer, M.P. for Marlborough, 1679–1681, and Wiltshire, 1685
Thomas Bruce, 1st Baron of Clackmannan (died 1358/59)
Thomas Bruce (British Army officer) (1738–1797), British Member of Parliament for Marlborough, 1790–1796, and Great Bedwyn, 1796–1797
Thomas Charles Bruce (1825–1890), British Member of Parliament for Portsmouth, 1874–1885
Thomas R. Bruce, co-founder of the Legal Information Institute and author of Cello, the first web browser for Microsoft Windows
Thomas Bruce (cricketer) (born 1983), English cricketer
Thomas Bruce, 1st Earl of Elgin (1599–1663), Scottish nobleman
Thomas Bruce (priest) (1636–1689), Anglican priest in Ireland and Archdeacon of Raphoe

See also
Tom Bruce (swimmer) (born 1952), former US swimmer
Tom Bruce (rugby league) (fl. 1910s), rugby league player in Australia
Thomas de Brus (c. 1284–1307), brother of Robert I of Scotland